Richard Butler may refer to:

Military 
Richard Butler, 1st Earl of Arran (1639–1686), 1st Earl of Arran, marshal of the army in Ireland, lord deputy of Ireland
Richard Butler (general) (1743–1791), American Revolutionary War General, later killed fighting Native Americans in Ohio
Richard Butler (British Army officer) (1870–1935), British Army general, served in World War I
Richard W. Butler, U.S. Navy aviator and officer

Politicians 
Richard Butler (c. 1510–68 or later), Member of Parliament (MP)
Sir Richard Butler, 5th Baronet (1699–1771), Irish MP for Carlow County 1730–1761
Richard Butler (Australian politician) (1850–1925), Premier of South Australia
Sir Richard Butler, 7th Baronet (1761–1817), Irish and British MP for Carlow County 1783–1790 and 1796–1802
Richard Layton Butler (1885–1966), Australian politician, Premier of South Australia
Richard A. Butler (Irish politician), Irish independent senator
Rab Butler (Richard Austen Butler, 1902–1982), British politician and Chancellor of the Exchequer
Richard Butler, 1st Earl of Glengall (1775–1819), Irish peer
Richard Butler, 2nd Earl of Glengall (1794–1858), Irish politician and peer

Musicians 
Richard Butler (singer) (born 1956), lead singer of The Psychedelic Furs and former lead singer of Love Spit Love
Richard Butler (album), the singer's self-titled album released in 2006
Richard Preston Butler, Jr., real name of rapper/songwriter Rico Love

Others 
Richard Butler, 1st Viscount Mountgarret (1500–1571)
Richard Butler, 3rd Viscount Mountgarret (1578–1651)
Richard Butler, 17th Viscount Mountgarret (1936–2004), British soldier
Richard Butler (author) (1844–1928), British dramatist
Richard Butler (Dean of Clonmacnoise), 19th-century Irish Anglican priest
Richard Butler (English priest) (died 1612), English priest
Richard Butler (publisher) (1834–1925), Canadian publisher
Richard Butler (white supremacist) (1918–2004), American founder of the Aryan Nations
Richard C. Butler (1929–2012), British farmer and banker, President of the National Farmers' Union
Richard E. Butler, general secretary of the International Telecommunication Union 1983–89, Australian federal public servant
Richard Butler (diplomat) (born 1942), Australian diplomat, arms inspector, and former governor of Tasmania
Richard Butler, American businessman and eponym of Butler, New Jersey
Rich Butler (born 1973), baseball player
Richard J. Butler, palaeontologist

Butler, Richard